Ammand (also Romanized as Amand, Ammend, and Emmend) is a village in Rudqat Rural District of Sufian District, Shabestar County, East Azerbaijan province, Iran. At the 2006 National Census, its population was 2,282 in 605 households. The following census in 2011 counted 1,910 people in 619 households. The latest census in 2016 showed a population of 1,664 people in 577 households; it was the largest village in its rural district.

References 

Shabestar County

Populated places in East Azerbaijan Province

Populated places in Shabestar County